Live From the Fall is American jam band Blues Traveler's first full-length live album, released on July 2, 1996 (see 1996 in music). It presents highlights of the band's autumn 1995 tour on two discs.

Track listing
">" indicates a segue directly into the next track.

Disc one
"Love and Greed" (Chan Kinchla, John Popper) – 5:15
"Mulling It Over" > (Kinchla, Popper) – 8:04
"Closing Down the Park" (Kinchla, Popper) – 12:55
"Regarding Steven" (Popper) – 4:42
"NY Prophesie" (Kinchla, Popper) – 5:14
"100 Years" (Popper) – 4:59
"Crash Burn" (Kinchla, Popper) – 3:24
"Gina" (Popper, Kinchla) – 6:45
"But Anyway" (Kinchla, Popper) – 5:55
"Mountain Cry" (Brendan Hill) – 15:17

Disc two
Abbreviated titles (one or two words each) are used in the liner notes to indicate the songs on this disc.

"Alone" (Popper) – 15:43
"Freedom" (Popper) – 4:15
"The Mountains Win Again" (Bobby Sheehan) – 5:42
"What's for Breakfast" (Popper, Sheehan)– 4:02
"Go Outside and Drive" > (Popper) – 9:06
"Low Rider" > (War) "Go Outside and Drive" > – 10:48
"Run-Around" (Popper) – 4:35
"Sweet Talking Hippie" (Hill, Kinchla, Popper, Sheehan) "Imagine" (John Lennon) – 19:46

Song information
"Closing Down the Park" is a song about the Tompkins Square Park Riot. No studio recording of it has ever been released outside of a demo.

A studio version of "Regarding Steven" is included on the CD single for "Run-Around."

The performance of "Alone" contains a previously-unreleased bridge section which later became part of the song "Traveler Suite" from Decisions of the Sky.

The "Go / Low / Go / Run" medley includes snippets from the following non-Blues Traveler songs: "Linus and Lucy," "Tequila," "Loser," "Inchworm," and "La Bamba."

"Sweet Talking Hippie" and "Imagine" are included on the same track, but both are standalone performances without a segue from one to the other.

"Sweet Talking Hippie" includes a snippet from the "Galop Infernal," composed by Jacques Offenbach for the operetta Orpheus in the Underworld.

Certifications

References

Blues Traveler live albums
1996 live albums
A&M Records live albums